Lee Percy (born February 10, 1953) is an American film editor. At the 61st Primetime Creative Arts Emmy Awards, he received two Outstanding Single-Camera Picture Editing for a Limited Series or Movie nominations for editing the 2009 television films Taking Chance and Grey Gardens, winning for the former.

A native of Kalamazoo, Michigan, Percy initially trained to be an actor at Juilliard before switching focus to editing.

Director Kimberly Peirce stated that Percy's editing provided the constructive structuring of the film Boys Don't Cry via deciding which scenes to keep or cut, allowing her to see which would work in the final version.

Percy made his directorial debut on the short film Dreaming American.

Percy has been a Creative Adviser at the Sundance Directors Lab as well as a mentor at the IFP.

Select filmography

As editor
Shogun Assassin (1980)
The Killing of America (1981)
They Call Me Bruce? (1982)
Re-Animator (1985)
Troll (1986)
From Beyond (1986)
Dolls (1987)
Slam Dance (1987)
Checking Out (1989)
Blue Steel (1990)
Reversal of Fortune (1990)
Year of the Gun (1991)
Single White Female (1992)
Against the Wall (1994)
Corrina, Corrina (1994)
Kiss of Death (1995)
Before and After (1996)
Desperate Measures (1998)
54 (1998)
Boys Don't Cry (1999)
The Believer (2001)
The Center of the World (2001)
Murder by Numbers (2002)
Maria Full of Grace (2004)
A Home at the End of the World (2004)
A Love Song for Bobby Long (2004)
The Ice Harvest (2005)
Mrs. Harris (2005)
Wind Chill (2007)
Noise (2007)
Taking Chance (2009)
Grey Gardens (2009)
Into Temptation (2009)
Amelia (2009)
As Good as Dead (2010)
Thin Ice (2011)
Disconnect (2012)
Carrie (2013)
Dukhtar (2014)
Angelica (2015)
Touched with Fire (2015)
Snowden (2016)
The Mountain Between Us (2017)
Mapplethorpe (2018)
The Kindergarten Teacher (2018)

As Additional/Assistant Editor
Roar (1981)
Kiss of the Spider Woman (1985)
Bernard and Doris (2006)
Archie's Final Project (2009)
Into the Storm (2009)
A Dog Year (2009)
Salt (2010)
Cinema Verite (2011)
What Maisie Knew (2012)

References

External links
Lee Percy at the Internet Movie Database

1953 births
Juilliard School alumni
People from Kalamazoo, Michigan
Living people
Film directors from Michigan
American film editors